Volatile is the debut album by American metalcore band A Hero A Fake, released on October 28, 2008 through Victory Records.  A music video for the album's single, I Know I, was produced by Scott Hansen and premiered on MTV2 on February 21, 2009.

Track listing

Personnel
A Hero A Fake
Justin Brown – Vocals
Eric Morgan - Guitar
Patrick Jeffers – Guitar
Lenin Hernandez – Guitar, Vocals†
Matt Davis – Bass
Tim Burgess – Drums, Percussion

† filed for name change to Alex Avigliano

Production
Produced and mixed by Jamie King
Mastered by Jamie King
Additional recording by Kit Walters
Album artwork by Jason Link
Band photography by Justin Reich

References

A Hero A Fake albums
2008 albums
Victory Records albums
Albums produced by Jamie King (record producer)